Lovech Zoo is a zoo located in Stratesh Park in Lovech, (international transliteration Loveč) is a city in north-central Bulgaria.

Incidents
On August 3, 2014, a jaguar escaped from its cage at the zoo in the northern Bulgarian city of Lovech, after a zoo keeper left the doors open. The jaguar was shot dead the next day.

Notes

External links

Buildings and structures in Lovech
Zoos in Bulgaria